Francisco Ramírez may refer to:
 Francisco Ramirez (bishop) (died 1564)
 Francisco Ramírez (governor) (1786–1821), Argentine governor of Entre Ríos during the Argentine War of Independence
 Francisco Ramírez (field hockey) (born 1948), Mexican former field hockey player
 Francisco Ramírez (Honduran footballer) (born 1976), Honduran footballer
 Francisco Vargas Ramirez, Puerto Rican boxer
 Paco Ramírez {born 1965), Mexican football manager and former footballer